is a 1982 Italian film directed by Franco Zeffirelli based on Pietro Mascagni's 1890 opera of the same name. It stars tenor Plácido Domingo, mezzo-soprano Elena Obraztsova, and baritone Renato Bruson, all singing their own roles. Georges Prêtre conducted the Teatro alla Scala Orchestra for the movie's soundtrack. The film was made for broadcast on television. In 2003, it was released on DVD by Deutsche Grammophon, paired with Pagliacci (having earlier been released by Philips/Decca on DVD), also starring Plácido Domingo and directed by Franco Zeffirelli.

Production
Initially, the Italian television network RAI expressed interest in recording the live opening night double-bill of Franco Zeffirelli's stage productions of Cavalleria rusticana and Pagliacci at the Teatro alla Scala. However, the director wanted to film the operas like movies instead of live stage productions. Over the course of two days, he filmed both operas on the stage of La Scala without an audience and in segments of ten minutes or less. He later added pick-up shots at a film studio in Milan. He also filmed some on location in Vizzini, Sicily for greater authenticity.

Reception
Originally shown on Italian television, it was later replayed on U.S. television to enthusiastic reactions.

References

External links
 

1982 films
1982 television films
1982 musical films
Italian musical films
Italian television films
1980s Italian-language films
Films directed by Franco Zeffirelli
Films based on operas
Films based on works by Giovanni Verga
Films set in Sicily
Films set in the 19th century
Opera films
1980s Italian films